Love Deluxe is the fourth studio album by English band Sade, released by Epic Records in the United Kingdom on 26 October 1992 and in the United States on 3 November 1992.

Critical reception

In a contemporary review for The Village Voice, music critic Robert Christgau felt that half of the album cannot qualify with Sade's most memorable songs and particularly panned the lyric about a Somali woman who has a life that "hurts like brand-new shoes" on the song "Pearls". Amy Linden of Entertainment Weekly stated that the album "surges with emotion, but the mostly lush ambient music on Love Deluxe is low on the oomph meter." In a retrospective review, AllMusic's Ron Wynn wrote that it "marked a return to the detached cool jazz backing and even icier vocals that made her debut album a sensation" with an "urbane sound."

In 2020, Rolling Stone ranked the album 247th on its list of the "500 Greatest Albums of All Time". In September 2022, Pitchfork ranked Love Deluxe as the 52nd best album of the 1990s.

Commercial performance
Love Deluxe peaked at number 10 on the UK Albums Chart, and was certified gold by the British Phonographic Industry (BPI) on 1 June 1993. In the United States, the album peaked at number three on the Billboard 200, and as of May 2003, it had sold 3.4 million copies. The Recording Industry Association of America (RIAA) certified it four-times platinum on 9 November 1994, denoting shipments in excess of four million copies. The album was also commercially successful elsewhere, reaching number one in France and the top 10 in Belgium, Italy, Japan, the Netherlands, New Zealand, Portugal, Spain, Sweden and Switzerland. By April 1993, the album had sold three million copies worldwide, including 220,000 copies in Italy.

Aftermath
Following the release of Love Deluxe, the band had a seven-year hiatus, during which Sade Adu came under media scrutiny with rumours of depression and addiction and later gave birth to her first child. During this time, the other members of the band, Matthewman, Denman, and Hale, went on to other projects, including Sweetback, which released a self-titled album in 1996. Matthewman also played a major role in the development of Maxwell's career, providing instrumentation and production work for the R&B singer's first two albums.

Track listing

Personnel
Credits adapted from the liner notes of Love Deluxe.

Sade
 Paul S. Denman – bass
 Sade Adu – vocals
 Andrew Hale – keyboards
 Stuart Matthewman – guitars, saxophone

Additional musicians
 Leroy Osbourne – vocals
 Martin Ditcham – drums ; percussion 
 Nick Ingman – string arrangements 
 Gavyn Wright – orchestra leader
 Tony Pleeth – solo cello

Technical
 Sade – production, arrangements
 Mike Pela – co-production, engineering
 Chris Lord-Alge – engineering, mixing 
 Sandro Franchin – engineering assistance
 Adrian Moore – engineering assistance
 Marc Williams – engineering assistance
 Stephen Marcussen – mastering

Artwork
 Albert Watson – photography
 Peter Brawne – design
 Quest Typesetting – production

Charts

Weekly charts

Year-end charts

Certifications and sales

References

1992 albums
Ambient albums by English artists
Cool jazz albums
Epic Records albums
Sade (band) albums
Trip hop albums by English artists